Basziri may refer to:
Basziri, Kokologho
Basziri, Nanoro